Galird or Gelyard or Geliyerd or Geleyerd may refer to:
 Galird, Alborz
 Gelyard, Juybar, Mazandaran Province
 Geleyerd, Mahmudabad, Mazandaran Province